Surjit Patar (born Surjit Hunjan) is a Punjabi language writer and poet of Punjab, India. His poems enjoy immense popularity with the general public and have won high acclaim from critics.

Biography

Patar hails from village Pattar Kalan in Jalandhar district from where he got his surname. He graduated from Randhir College, Kapurthala and then went on to get a Master's degree from Punjabi University, Patiala and then a PhD in Literature on "Transformation of Folklore in Guru Nanak Vani" from Guru Nanak Dev University, Amritsar. He then joined the academic profession and retired as Professor of Punjabi from Punjab Agricultural University, Ludhiana. He started writing poetry in mid-sixties. Among his works of poetry are "Hawa ਵਿਚ Likhe Harf" (Words written in the Air), Birkh Arz Kare (Thus Spake the Tree), Hanere Vich Sulagdi Varnmala (Words Smouldering in the Dark), Lafzaan Di Dargah (Shrine of Words), Patjhar Di Pazeb (Anklet of Autumn) and Surzameen (Music Land).

He has translated into Punjabi the three tragedies of Federico García Lorca, the play Nagmandala of Girish Karnad, and poems of Bertolt Brecht and Pablo Neruda. He has also adapted plays from Jean Giradoux, Euripides and Racine. He has written tele-scripts on Punjabi poets from Sheikh Farid to Shiv Kumar Batalvi.

He is the president of Punjab Arts Council, Chandigarh. In the past, he has held the office of the President, Punjabi Sahit Akademi, Ludhiana. He was awarded Padma Shri in 2012.

Well known poems 
"Candles", "Hanere vich sulagdi Varanmala", "Aiya Nand Kishore", "Hanera Jarega Kiven", "Fasla", "Koi Daalia Cho Langeya Hawa Bann Ke" and others.

Filmography
Surjit Patar has written dialogues of the Punjabi movie Shaheed Uddham Singh and Videsh, the Punjabi version of Deepa Mehta's movie Heaven on Earth.

Awards

 1979 Punjab Sahitya Akademi Award
 1993: Sahitya Akademi Award for Hanere Vich Sulghdi Varnmala
 1999: Panchnad Puruskar by Bhartiya Bhasha Parishad, Kolkata
 1999 Bhartiya Bhasha Prishad, Kolkata
 2007–2008 Anad Kav Sanman
 2009: Saraswati Samman by K.K.Birla foundation.
 2009 Gangadhar National Award for Poetry, Sambalpur University, Orissa
 2012: Padma Shri Award in the field of Literature and Education (fourth highest civilian award in the Republic of India)
 2014 Kusumagraj Literary Award-2014

See also
Vir Singh (writer)
Prof. Puran Singh (writer)
Ajit Cour

References

External links

1945 births
Living people
Recipients of the Padma Shri in literature & education
Recipients of the Sahitya Akademi Award in Punjabi
Recipients of the Gangadhar National Award
Guru Nanak Dev University alumni
Indian male screenwriters
20th-century Indian translators
Academic staff of Punjab Agricultural University
Punjabi-language poets
Punjabi University alumni
Punjabi people
Translators from German
Translators from Spanish
Translators to Punjabi
20th-century Indian poets
Poets from Punjab, India
Screenwriters from Punjab, India
21st-century Indian translators
21st-century Indian poets
Punjabi screenwriters
20th-century Indian male writers
21st-century Indian male writers